Eric Parker may refer to:

 Eric Parker (illustrator) (1898–1974), British illustrator
 Eric Parker (American football), American football coach